Guillermo Vilas defeated Alejandro Ganzábal 6–2, 6–4 to win the 1982 Buenos Aires Grand Prix tennis singles competition. Ivan Lendl was the champion but did not defend his title.

Seeds
A champion seed is indicated in bold text while text in italics indicates the round in which that seed was eliminated.

  Guillermo Vilas '(champion)
  Víctor Pecci Sr. (second round)  Pedro Rebolledo (first round)  Manuel Orantes (second round)  Ricardo Cano (first round)  Pablo Arraya (second round)  Ángel Giménez (first round)  Diego Pérez (semifinals)''

Draw

Key
 Q – Qualifier
 R – Retired

External links
 1982 ATP Buenos Aires Singles draw

Singles